Dušan Dragosavac (1 December 1919 – 21 December 2014) was a Croatian Serb politician who served as President of the League of Communists of Yugoslavia from 20 October 1981 until 29 June 1982.

Born in the village of Vrebac near Gospić, Dragosavac graduated from the University of Zagreb Faculty of Law. He joined the Young Communist League of Yugoslavia (SKOJ) in 1941 and the League of Communists of Yugoslavia (SKJ) in 1942. During World War II he was member of the Yugoslav Partisans. After the war he spent his entire career in politics and since the 1950s held various senior positions in the League of Communists of Croatia (SKH), the Croatian branch of the SKJ. He died on 21 December 2014, aged 95.

References 

1919 births
2014 deaths
Faculty of Law, University of Zagreb alumni
League of Communists of Croatia politicians
Serbs of Croatia
People from Gospić
Central Committee of the League of Communists of Yugoslavia members